Shahumyan is a town in the Lori Province of Armenia.

Etymology 
It was named Shahumyan after the Bolshevik-Armenian commander Stepan Shahumyan following Armenia's independence.

References

External links 

World Gazeteer: Armenia – World-Gazetteer.com

Populated places in Lori Province